Anna of Russia (1693–1740) was the ruler of Russia from 1730 until her death in 1740.

Anna of Russia may also refer to:

 Anne of Kiev (–1075), daughter of Yaroslav I the Wise; wife of Henry I of France
 Anna of Moscow (1393–1417), daughter of Vasily I of Moscow; wife of John VIII Palaiologos
 Anna Koltovskaya (bef. 1572–1626), fourth wife of Ivan IV of Russia
 Anna Vasilchikova (died 1577), fifth wife of Ivan IV of Russia
 Tsarevna Anastasia Vasilievna of Russia (born 1609), daughter of Vasili IV of Russia
 Tsarevna Anna Mikhailovna of Russia (1630–1692), daughter of Michael I of Russia
 Grand Duchess Anna Petrovna of Russia (1708–1728), daughter of Peter I of Russia; wife of Charles Frederick, Duke of Holstein-Gottorp; and mother of Peter III of Russia
 Grand Duchess Anna Leopoldovna of Russia (1718–1746), mother and regent of Ivan VI of Russia; born Elisabeth Katharina Christine of Mecklenburg-Schwerin
 Grand Duchess Anna Petrovna of Russia (1757–1759), daughter of Peter III of Russia
 Grand Duchess Anna Pavlovna of Russia (1795–1865), daughter of Paul I of Russia; wife of William II of the Netherlands
 Princess Juliane of Saxe-Coburg-Saalfeld (1781–1860), daughter of Francis, Duke of Saxe-Coburg-Saalfeld; wife of Grand Duke Constantine Pavlovich of Russia as Grand Duchess Anna Feodorovna of Russia
 Grand Duchess Anna Mikhailovna of Russia (1834–1836), daughter of Grand Duke Michael Pavlovich of Russia